Sandy Campbell is an American actress and singer, based in Southern California. She gained national recognition for debut solo CD, Crazy World and performance in the premiere of Lucy Simon's Zhivago at the La Jolla Playhouse, directed by multiple Tony-winner, Des McAnuff.

Stage work

She is a resident artist at Cygnet Theater Company in San Diego, as well as an associate-artist with Lamb's Players Theater. She has been nominated for the San Diego Theater Critics Circle's Craig Noel award six times, winning in 2012 for, 'Leading Actress in a Musical' for her performance in Parade. In 2015, she was nominated for 'Leading Actress in a Musical''', for her performance in Master Class.

Other works includes The Happiest Fella (Rosabella), Man of La Mancha (Aldonza), Sweeney Todd (Johanna), Falsettos (Cordelia), Into the Woods (Cinderella), West Side Story (María), Drood (Rosa Bud), and Fiddler on the Roof (Hodel). She has appeared in straight plays, most notably as Bella in Lost in Yonkers.

Vocalist
As a solo cabaret artist, Sandy has developed multiple cabaret shows with musical director G. Scott Lacy. And I'll Be There: Songs of Love and Friendship premiered at North Coast Repertory Theater in October 2003. The Stories Go On, which has received audience acclaim in multiple venues. In 2005 she released her first studio recording, Crazy World'' (Azahara Entertainment), a collection of mostly lesser-known theater songs.

Reviews
 “Campbell sings with irresistible clarity and power…" - Los Angeles Times
 “Outstanding…a striking voice and presence...” - KPBS Radio
 “Musical theater heaven…there are echoes of Judy Collins in Campbell’s soprano.” - San Diego Union
 “Exceptional…Most remarkable…new levels of beauty and richness while filling her character with great tenderness, intelligence and emotion.” - San Diego Playbill
 "It only took hearing the first few phrases sung to let me know the songs are in good hands...Sandy's voice is instantly appealing...She has an open and sweet quality, but with intelligent phrasing that keeps her safely far away from over-sentimentality. It's no surprise to learn that she has experience in theater and cabaret. It shows...Campbell and G. Scott Lacy crystallize the emotional potential of rich songs like these. An encore would be very welcome." - Talkin' Broadway
 "...among the very best -- musically lovely and (rarer still) beautifully acted...The album overall is really wonderful; fine choices of songs, all well done." - Josh Rubins, Composer/Lyricist (Brownstone (musical), All the Queen's Men)
 "Beautiful, sensitive...a wonderful recording." - Jeff Blumenkrantz, Composer (The Other Franklin)
 "Campbell exhibits real talent with the material." - Max Preeo, Editor, Show Music Magazine

References 

American musical theatre actresses
Living people
Actresses from California
Singers from California
Year of birth missing (living people)
21st-century American actresses
21st-century American singers